The 1993 Kansas City Royals season was a season in American baseball. It involved the Royals finishing 3rd in the American League West with a record of 84 wins and 78 losses. This was George Brett's final season in the major leagues, as well as the team's final season in the AL West.

Offseason
 November 17, 1992: Kerwin Moore was drafted from the Royals by the Florida Marlins as the 61st pick in the 1992 MLB expansion draft.
 November 19, 1992: Dennis Moeller and Joel Johnston were traded by the Royals to the Pittsburgh Pirates for José Lind.
 November 25, 1992: Mark Gubicza was signed as a free agent by the Royals.
 December 8, 1992: David Cone was signed as a free agent by the Royals.
 December 8, 1992: Greg Gagne was signed as a free agent by the Royals.
 December 9, 1992: Jeff Shaw and Tim Spehr were traded by the Royals to the Montreal Expos for Mark Gardner and Doug Piatt.
 January 27, 1993: Hubie Brooks was signed as a free agent by the Royals.
 February 22, 1993: Gregg Jefferies and Ed Gerald (minors) were traded by the Royals to the St. Louis Cardinals for Félix José and Craig Wilson.
February 26, 1993: Scott Bailes was signed as a free agent with the Kansas City Royals.

Regular season

Season standings

Record vs. opponents

Notable transactions
April 3, 1993: Scott Bailes was released by the Kansas City Royals. 
 April 26, 1993: Mike Boddicker was purchased from the Royals by the Milwaukee Brewers.
 April 27, 1993: Tuffy Rhodes was signed as a free agent by the Royals.
 June 3, 1993: Jacque Jones was drafted by the Royals in the 31st round of the 1993 Major League Baseball draft, but did not sign.
 June 14, 1993: Dave Stieb was signed as a free agent by the Royals.
 June 19, 1993: Gary Gaetti was signed as a free agent by the Royals.
 July 30, 1993: Tuffy Rhodes was traded by the Royals to the Chicago Cubs as part of a 3-team trade. The New York Yankees sent John Habyan to the Royals. The Cubs sent Paul Assenmacher to the Yankees.
 July 30, 1993: Greg Cadaret was signed as a free agent by the Royals.
 July 31, 1993: Dave Stieb was released by the Royals.
 July 31, 1993: Jon Lieber and Dan Miceli were traded by the Royals to the Pittsburgh Pirates for Stan Belinda.
 August 1, 1993: Owner Ewing Kauffman, responsible for bringing major league baseball to Kansas City, dies at age 76.

Roster

Player stats

Batting

Starters by position
Note: Pos = Position; G = Games played; AB = At bats; H = Hits; Avg. = Batting average; HR = Home runs; RBI = Runs batted in

Other batters
Note: G = Games played; AB = At bats; H = Hits; Avg. = Batting average; HR = Home runs; RBI = Runs batted in

Pitching

Starting pitchers 
Note: G = Games pitched; IP = Innings pitched; W = Wins; L = Losses; ERA = Earned run average; SO = Strikeouts

Other pitchers 
Note: G = Games pitched; IP = Innings pitched; W = Wins; L = Losses; ERA = Earned run average; SO = Strikeouts

Relief pitchers 
Note: G = Games pitched; W = Wins; L = Losses; SV = Saves; ERA = Earned run average; SO = Strikeouts

Farm system

References

1993 Kansas City Royals at Baseball Reference
1993 Kansas City Royals at Baseball Almanac

Kansas City Royals seasons
Kansas City Royals season
Kansas